Henrik Andersson may refer to:

Henrik Andersson (canoeist), Swedish sprint canoer
Henrik Andersson (tennis) (born 1977), former professional tennis player
Henrik Andersson (badminton) (born 1977), Swedish badminton player